Jon Reid Oberlander FRSE (16 June 1962 – 19 December 2017) was Professor of Epistemics at the School of Informatics, University of Edinburgh. He received a BA in Philosophy from Pembroke College, Cambridge, in 1983 and a PhD in Cognitive Science from the University of Edinburgh in 1987.

Research 
Oberlander described three main strands in his research: intelligent labelling; affect in communication (e.g., in research on personality types in emails with Alastair Gill); and multimodal reasoning and communication (e.g., in research with Keith Stenning on diagrammatic reasoning).

Honours 

In March 2016 Oberlander was elected a Fellow of the Royal Society of Edinburgh, Scotland's National Academy for science and letters, where he served as a member of their Young People's committee.

References

External links 
Jon Oberlander's homepage

1962 births
2017 deaths
Oberlander
Alumni of Pembroke College, Cambridge
British philosophers
British cognitive scientists
Alumni of the University of Edinburgh
Fellows of the Royal Society of Edinburgh